This is a list of species of the tephritid fruit fly genus Rhagoletis. As of 2006, 70 species have been described.

 Rhagoletis acuticornis (Steyskal)
 Rhagoletis adusta Foote 
 Rhagoletis almatensis Rohdendorf 
 Rhagoletis alternata (Fallén) 
 Rhagoletis bagheera Richter & Kandybina 
 Rhagoletis basiola (Osten Sacken) 
 Rhagoletis basiola Osten Sacken 
 Rhagoletis batava Hering 
 Rhagoletis berberidis Jermy 
 Rhagoletis berberis Curran 
 Rhagoletis bezziana (Hendel) 
 Rhagoletis blanchardi Aczél 
 Rhagoletis boycei Cresson 
 Rhagoletis caucasica Kandybina & Richter 
 Rhagoletis cerasi (Linnaeus) cherry fruit fly
 Rhagoletis chionanthi Bush 
 Rhagoletis chumsanica (Rohdendorf) 
 Rhagoletis cingulata (Loew) eastern cherry fruit fly
 Rhagoletis completa (Cresson) Walnut Husk Fly
 Rhagoletis conversa (Brèthes) 
 Rhagoletis cornivora Bush 
 Rhagoletis ebbettsi Bush 
 Rhagoletis electromorpha Berlocher 
 Rhagoletis emiliae Richter 
 Rhagoletis fausta (Osten Sacken) 
 Rhagoletis ferruginea Hendel 
 Rhagoletis flavicincta Enderlein 
 Rhagoletis flavigenualis Hering 
 Rhagoletis indifferens (Curran) cherry fruit fly
 Rhagoletis jamaicensis Foote 
 Rhagoletis juglandis (Cresson) walnut-husk-infesting fly
 Rhagoletis juniperina Marcovitch 
 Rhagoletis kurentsovi (Rohdendorf) 
 Rhagoletis lycopersella Smyth 
 Rhagoletis macquartii (Loew) 
 Rhagoletis magniterebra (Rohdendorf) 
 Rhagoletis meigenii (Loew) 
 Rhagoletis mendax (Curran) blueberry maggot
 Rhagoletis metallica (Schiner) 
 Rhagoletis mongolica Kandybina 
 Rhagoletis nicaraguensis Hernández-Ortiz & Frías 
 Rhagoletis nigripes Rohdendorf 
 Rhagoletis nova (Schiner) 
 Rhagoletis ochraspis (Wiedemann) 
 Rhagoletis osmanthi Bush 
 Rhagoletis penela Foote 
 Rhagoletis persimilis Bush 
 Rhagoletis pomonella (Walsh) apple maggot fly, railroad worm
 Rhagoletis psalida Hendel 
 Rhagoletis ramosae Hernández-Ortiz 
 Rhagoletis reducta Hering 
 Rhagoletis rhytida Hendel 
 Rhagoletis ribicola Doane 
 Rhagoletis rohdendorfi Korneyev & Merz 
 Rhagoletis rumpomaculata Hardy 
 Rhagoletis samojlovitshae (Rohdendorf) 
 Rhagoletis scutellata Zia 
 Rhagoletis solanophaga Hernández-Ortiz & Frías 
 Rhagoletis stepanae Te Tit Hermanandante 
 Rhagoletis striatella Wulp 
 Rhagoletis suavis (Loew) Walnut Husk Maggot
 Rhagoletis tabellaria (Fitch) 
 Rhagoletis tomatis Foote 
 Rhagoletis triangularis Hernández-Ortiz & Frías 
 Rhagoletis turanica (Rohdendorf) 
 Rhagoletis turpiniae Hernández-Ortiz
 Rhagoletis willinki Aczél 
 Rhagoletis zephyria Snow 
 Rhagoletis zernyi Hendel 
 Rhagoletis zoqui Bush

References
 after Fruit Fly (Diptera: Tephritidae) Species Database from 2006-12-22

Rhagoletis